Parsiana is a semi-monthly magazine written in English and published in Bombay for the Zoroastrian community. As of 2019, it was in its 55th year of publication.

History

1960-70s
Parsiana was founded in Bombay on November 1964 by Pestonji Warden. The magazine covered articles about Zoroastrian religion, its history, customs and traditions, with the tagline "A new medium for old wisdom."
The magazine became embroiled in community politics especially when Warden argued with the Bombay Parsi Punchayet (BPP) over the printing of the month at the Godrej Printing Press run by the apex Bombay trust. For some time, it was cyclostyled.[1]

In 1973, Warden sold the publication to the journalist Jehangir Patel. In 1983, ownership of the publication was transferred to Parsiana Publications Private Limited.

1980s
Parsiana was the first publication in India to use the prefix Ms when referring to women instead of Miss and Mrs, despite opposition from some readers. It has since dropped both Mr and Ms.

Beginning in 1987, Parsiana published information surrounding community births, marriages, and deaths in the Zoroastrian community in Bombay; as well as sporadic data received from outstation sources. In 1988, it published data on interfaith marriages in Bombay which proved highly controversial. There was a public outcry as a taboo had been broken.

Other publications
The Parsiana Book Of Iranian Names was first published by Parsiana in 1978. The names were compiled by the late Avesta and Pahlavi scholar Ervad Jamshed Katrak.

In 2005, Parsiana published Judgments, a compilation of judgements delivered in legal cases on the Zoroastrian community.

Parsiana started a website in 2002 which carried extracts from the magazine. Beginning in December 2012, the entire contents of Parsiana issues have been published online.

References

External links
Official Website

1964 establishments in Maharashtra
English-language magazines published in India
Magazines published in India
Magazines established in 1964
Parsi culture
Zoroastrian media
Semimonthly magazines
Mass media in Mumbai
Local interest magazines